Bamba Mamadou (1952 - 2012)  was an Ivorian politician. He served as foreign minister of Côte d'Ivoire from 14 March 2003 to 3 January 2006.

References

Government ministers of Ivory Coast
Ivorian diplomats
1952 births
2012 deaths
Foreign Ministers of Ivory Coast